The Great Mosque of al-Nuri was a mosque in Mosul, Iraq. It was famous for its leaning minaret, which gave the city its nickname "the hunchback". Tradition holds that the mosque was first built in the late 12th century, although it underwent many renovations over the years. The mosque withstood various hostile invading forces over its 850-year history until it was destroyed, along with its distinctive minaret, in the Battle of Mosul in 2017.

Iraqi troops attributed the destruction of the Great Mosque to the Islamic State in a vandalistic move to destroy it rather than let it go from their hold. The mosque had held a symbolic importance to IS and its leader, Abu Bakr al-Baghdadi, as it was used in 2014 by the militants to self-declare their "caliphate". IS's black flag had been flying on the 45-metre minaret after their militants surged across Iraq and Syria seizing territory, and they had promised to never let their flag be lowered from it. Contrary to official accounts and local eyewitnesses, IS alleged that U.S. forces destroyed it. IS's claim was not substantiated. The BBC reported that "IS accused the United States-led coalition aircraft of bombing the site, but experts said a video circulated online appeared to show charges inside the structures exploding."

Iraqi Prime Minister Haider al-Abadi stated that the destruction of the mosque by IS was a "declaration of defeat", and that "[b]lowing up the al-Hadba minaret and the al-Nuri mosque amounts to an official acknowledgment of defeat [by ISIS]."

Construction 

Tradition holds that Nur ad-Din Zangi, a Turkoman atabeg of the Great Seljuk Empire and sultan of its Syrian province, built the mosque in 1172–1173, shortly before his death. According to the chronicle of Ibn al-Athir, after Nur ad-Din took control of Mosul he ordered his nephew Fakhr al-Din to build the mosque:

In 1511, the mosque was extensively renovated by the Safavid Empire.

Minaret 

The mosque was well known for its leaning minaret, known as al-Hadba’ ("the hunchback"). Grattan Geary, a 19th-century traveler, described the minaret's appearance:

By the time the traveler Ibn Battuta visited in the 14th century it was already listing and had acquired its nickname. The design of the minaret follows a form originally developed in neighboring Iran and Central Asia and shares similarities with other minarets in northern Iraq, such as those in Mardin, Sinjar and Arbil. It is depicted on Iraq's 10,000 dinar note.

According to local tradition (which resolutely ignores chronology), the minaret gained its tilt after the Prophet Muhammad passed overhead while ascending to heaven. The minaret bowed itself in reverence but could only regain its balance after its top joint had been kinked in the opposite direction. According to local Christian tradition, however, the mosque's tilt was due to its bowing towards the tomb of the Virgin Mary, reputedly located near Arbil. It is also nicknamed by some as Iraq's "Tower of Pisa", as the mosque's signature tilt was compared to that of the Torre di Pisa in Italy.

Modern history 
Both the mosque and its madrasa were dismantled and reassembled in 1942 in a restoration programme undertaken by the Iraqi government. The minaret remained unrestored, although attempts were made in 1981 by an Italian firm to stabilise it. The bombing of Mosul during the Iran–Iraq War in the 1980s broke underground pipes and caused leaks under the minaret that further undermined it. The lean later worsened by another .

The cause of the lean was disputed – some have blamed the prevailing wind – but local officials have attributed it to the effects of thermal expansion caused by the heat of the sun, causing bricks on the sun-facing side to expand and progressively tilt the minaret. It was listed by the World Monuments Fund as a site of concern due to the ongoing risk of collapse.

The structure was targeted by Islamic State of Iraq and the Levant militants who occupied Mosul on 10 June 2014, and previously destroyed the Tomb of Yunus. However, residents of Mosul, incensed with the destruction of their cultural sites, protected the mosque by forming a human chain and forming a resistance against ISIL. Rather than destroying the site, Abu Bakr al-Baghdadi appeared during a Friday prayer in this mosque on 4 July 2014 to declare the formation of a new caliphate.

Destruction 

By June 2017, the Battle of Mosul had progressed to the stage that IS-controlled territory in Mosul was limited to the Old City area, which included the mosque. On 21 June 2017, Iraqi government forces reported that the mosque had been blown up by IS forces at 9:50 PM and that the blast was indicative of bombs being deliberately placed to bring it down.

Amaq, an information wing of IS that often reports news favorable to the terrorist organization, claimed an airstrike by the United States was responsible for the destruction, but this claim was not substantiated by any evidence.

Iraqi forces were within  of the mosque before the explosion, and finally captured the site a week later on 29 June. Aerial photographs and a video of the destruction were released by the Iraqi military a few hours after the explosion. The video, particularly, clearly showed charges inside the structure exploding.

Iraqi Prime Minister Haider al-Abadi stated that the destruction of the mosque was IS's "declaration of defeat". BBC News journalist Paul Adams interpreted the mosque's destruction as ISIL's "final act of angry defiance before finally losing their grip on Mosul".

Reconstruction 
On April 23, 2018, United Arab Emirates (UAE) pledged to reconstruct the mosque. The UAE will provide 50.4 million to fund the reconstruction project with a joint collaboration between the UAE, UNESCO, Iraq's culture ministry, and the International Centre for the Study of the Preservation and Restoration of Cultural Property (ICCROM). The project plan is the preservation of the square base of the leaning minaret as a memorial to the victims of ISIS as well as the construction of a replica which would be visible in the Mosul skyline. During the announcement, the UAE minister of Culture and Knowledge Development Noura Al Kaabi spoke at the Chatham House in central London and stated that "This is an initiative that defeats extremism in all its facets" and "[w]e don't want to allow the destruction of the past and the present". She hosted the first meeting of the joint committee in September 2018 in the UAE. The expected completion date of the planned reconstruction is in 2023. A foundation stone for the reconstruction was laid on 17 December 2018.

In April 2021, it was announced that a group of eight Egyptian architects have won a competition to reconstruct the mosque, from among 123 entries. The winning entry has been criticized as resembling Persian Gulf architecture more than traditional architecture in Mosul.

See also 

 Islam in Iraq
 List of mosques in Iraq
 Leaning Tower of Pisa
 Ratneshwar Mahadev temple
 Leaning Tower of Suurhusen

References

External links

Mosques in Mosul
Demolished buildings and structures in Iraq
Destroyed mosques
Inclined towers
12th-century mosques
Buildings and structures destroyed by ISIL
Buildings and structures demolished in 2017
Religious buildings and structures completed in 1173
Brick buildings and structures
Sunni mosques in Iraq